Neftchilar (or Neftçilər) is a subway station in Baku Metro. It was opened on 6 November 1972.

See also
List of Baku metro stations

References

Baku Metro stations
Railway stations opened in 1972
1972 establishments in Azerbaijan